The Taipei Children's Amusement Park (TCAP) is an amusement park in Shilin District, Taipei, Taiwan. It is the largest publicly operated amusement park in Taiwan.

History
The area where the park lies today used to be a historic playground called Taipei Children's Recreation Center. On 11 April 2006, the area was designated as a national archaeological site. In October 2007, the Taipei City Government then initiated a plan to redevelop the area into a new children's park. The park was then opened to the public on 16 December 2014. Taipei Rapid Transit Corporation was commissioned for its management and maintenance.

Architecture
The park spans over an area of 5 hectares. It is divided into three main zones, which are Fantasy Forest and Dream Ocean, Magic Planet and Toy Soldier Kingdom.

Transportation
The park is accessible within walking distance north west of Shilin Station of Taipei Metro.

See also
 List of tourist attractions in Taiwan

References

External links

 

2014 establishments in Taiwan
Amusement parks opened in 2014
Amusement parks in Taiwan
Buildings and structures in Taipei
Tourist attractions in Taipei